António Manuel Louro Paula (born 14 August 1937) is a Portuguese former footballer who played as a defender.

External links 
 
 
 António Paula at playmakerstats.com (English version of zerozero.pt)

Living people
1937 births
Portuguese footballers
Association football defenders
Primeira Liga players
S.L. Benfica footballers
FC Porto players
Portugal international footballers